Kankoduthavanitham  is a village in the Kudavasal taluk of Tiruvarur district in Tamil Nadu,

Demographics 

As per the 2001 census, Kankoduthavanitham had a population of 1,659 with 818 males and 841 females. The sex ratio was 1,028. The literacy rate was 74.15.

References 

 

Villages in Tiruvarur district